Max Hebeisen (27 June 1947 – 10 January 2023) was a Swiss boxer. He competed in the men's welterweight event at the 1968 Summer Olympics.

References

1947 births
Living people
Welterweight boxers
Swiss male boxers
Olympic boxers of Switzerland
Boxers at the 1968 Summer Olympics
Sportspeople from Bern